Millsaps College is a private liberal arts college in Jackson, Mississippi. It was founded in 1890 and is affiliated with the United Methodist Church.

History
The college was founded in 1889–90 by a Confederate veteran, Major Reuben Webster Millsaps, who donated the land for the college and $50,000. Dr. William Belton Murrah was the college's first president, and Bishop Charles Betts Galloway of the Methodist Episcopal Church South organized the college's early fund-raising efforts. Both men were honored with halls named in their honor. Major Millsaps and his wife are interred in a tomb near the center of campus. The current United Methodist Church continues to affiliate with the college.

Navy V-12 program
Millsaps was chosen as one of 131 sites for the training of Navy and Marine officers in the V-12 Navy College Training Program. In April 1943, 380 students arrived for the Navy V-12 program offering engineering, pre-medical and pre-dental training. Thereafter Millsaps began accepting students year-round for the program. A total of 873 officer candidates went through Millsaps between 1943 and 1945.

Traces of the Navy V-12 unit appear in the Bobashela (school yearbook) in 1944. That year, the Bobashela staff dedicated the yearbook to the unit and "Dr. Sanders," one of the unit's advisers. One section memorialized students who had been killed in action during World War II.

Civil rights era

Millsaps College students protested the shooting of Jackson State University student and civil rights worker Benjamin Brown, who was killed by police at a protest. The Mississippi Sovereignty Commission photographed the Millsaps protesters and identified them. The Sovereignty Commission spied on and conspired against civil rights activists and organized pressure and economic oppression of those who supported the civil rights movement in Mississippi.

Important dates in Millsaps history

 1890: Major Reuben Webster Millsaps founds the college with a personal gift of $50,000.
 1901: Millsaps builds the first golf course in Mississippi.
 1902: Mary Letitia Holloman becomes the first female graduate of Millsaps.
 1908: Sing-Ung Zung of Suzhou, China, becomes the first international student to graduate from Millsaps.
 1914: Old Main, one of the first buildings on campus, burns and is replaced by Murrah Hall.
 1916: Major Millsaps dies and is interred on campus.
 1931: The first night football game in Mississippi is played on the Millsaps campus between the Majors and Mississippi A&M (now Mississippi State University).
 1936: Millsaps College absorbs bankrupt Grenada College during the Great Depression.
 1943: Johnny Carson attends Millsaps for V-12 naval officer training, entertaining his comrades with a magic and humor act.
 1944: Louis H. Wilson, who graduated from the college in 1941, received the Medal of Honor for his actions at the Battle of Guam during World War II. Wilson became a General and the 26th Commandant of the Marine Corps in 1975. He was the first Marine Corps Commandant to serve full-time on the Joint Chiefs of Staff.
 1953: Dean Martin and Jerry Lewis judge a Millsaps beauty contest.
 1965: Millsaps becomes the first all-white college in Mississippi to voluntarily desegregate.
 1967: Robert F. Kennedy during his presidential campaign speaks at the college about the obligations of young Americans to give back to their country.
 1975: Presidential candidate Jimmy Carter speaks to Millsaps students about the crisis in the Middle East.
 1988: Millsaps initiates the first campus chapter of Habitat for Humanity in Mississippi.
 1989: Millsaps becomes the first school in Mississippi to have a chapter of the Phi Beta Kappa honor society.

Presidents
 William Belton Murrah, 1890–1910
 David Carlisle Hull, 1910–1912
 Alexander Farrar Watkins, 1912–1923
 David Martin Key, 1923–1938
 Marion Lofton Smith, 1938–1952
 Homer Ellis Finger, Jr., 1952–1964
 Benjamin Barnes Graves, 1965–1970
 Edward McDaniel Collins, Jr., 1970–1978
 George Marion Harmon (1978–2000) – After 22 years of leading Millsaps College, Harmon announced his resignation in the spring of 1999. His last day as president of Millsaps College was June 30, 2000.
 Frances Lucas (2000–2010) – Lucas was the first woman to hold the post at Millsaps. Lucas resigned on April 23, 2009. Lucas cited disagreements with faculty as the reason for her resignation.
 Howard McMillan, Dean of Millsaps' Else School of Management took over as Interim President in August 2009.
 Robert Pearigen, Vice President of University Relations at The University of the South, was selected to serve as the eleventh president of the college. He began his term in office on July 1, 2010.

Academics
Despite its religious affiliation, the curriculum is secular. The writing-intensive core curriculum requires each student to compile an acceptable portfolio of written work before the completion of the second year. Candidates for an undergraduate degree must also pass oral and written comprehensive exams in their major field of study.  These exams last up to three hours and may cover any required or elective course offered by the major department.  Unacceptable performance on comprehensive exams will prevent a candidate from receiving a degree, even if all coursework has been completed.  

Millsaps offers B.S., B.A., B.B.A., MBA and MAcc degrees and corresponding programs.

The current undergraduate population is 910 students on a 103-acre (417,000 m²) campus near downtown Jackson, Mississippi. The student-to-faculty ratio is 1:9 with an average class size of around 15 students. Millsaps offers 32 majors and 41 minors, including the option of a self-designed major, along with a multitude of study abroad and internship opportunities. Millsaps employs 97 full-time faculty members. Of those, 94 percent of tenure-track faculty hold a Ph.D. or a terminal degree in their field. The professors on the tenure track have the highest degree in their field.   The college offers research partnerships for undergraduate students and a variety of study abroad programs.  Millsaps reports that 57% of their student body comes from outside Mississippi; a large portion of out-of-state students are from neighboring Louisiana. Millsaps is home to 910 undergraduate, 75 graduate students from 26 states and territories plus 23 countries. The college also offers a Continuing Education program and the Community Enrichment Series for adults in the Jackson area.

Campus

The Millsaps campus is close to downtown Jackson. It is bordered by Woodrow Wilson Avenue to the north, North State Street to the east, West Street to the west, and Marshall Street to the south.

The center of campus is dominated by "The Bowl," where many events occur, including Homecoming activities, concerts, the Multicultural Festival, and Commencement.  Adjacent to the Bowl is the Campbell College Center, renovated in 2000, which contains the campus bookstore, post office, cafeteria, and Student Life offices.  This central section of campus also holds the Gertrude C. Ford Academic Complex, Olin Science Hall, Sullivan-Harrell Hall, and the Millsaps-Wilson Library.

The north part of campus includes the Hall Activities Center (commonly called "the HAC"), the sports fields, and the freshman dormitories. On the far northwestern corner is James Observatory, the oldest building on campus. Operational since 1901, the observatory underwent major renovations in 1980. It is open for celestial gazing.

Upperclassmen dormitories are located on the south side of campus, with Fraternity Row and the Christian Center. Originally constructed as a memorial to students and graduates who died in service during World War II, the Christian Center houses an auditorium and the departments of Performing Arts, History, and Religious Studies.

Between the Christian Center and Murrah Hall, which houses the Else School of Management, is the tomb of Major Millsaps and the "M" Bench, erected by the classes of 1926, 1927, and 1928. The Nicholson Garden was added to improve the aesthetics of this area.

Rankings and distinctions
Millsaps College professors are ranked among the best in the nation, according to The Princeton Review's The Best 377 Colleges – 2013 Edition. The Millsaps faculty won praise in The Princeton Review's special Top 20 category:  Professors Get High Marks, where Millsaps was ranked twelfth in the country.

Millsaps is one of 40 schools in Loren Pope's Colleges That Change Lives.

Millsaps is among 21 private universities and colleges nationwide named a "best buy" in the Fiske Guide to Colleges 2013. Millsaps is the only institution in Mississippi to earn the "best buy" honor from the annual guide. The guide names Millsaps as "the strongest liberal arts college in the deep, Deep South and by far the most progressive" and notes that what differentiates the school is "its focus on scholarly inquiry, spiritual growth, and community service, along with its Heritage Program, an interdisciplinary approach to world culture."

Athletics

The school's sports teams are known as the Majors and their colors are purple and white. They participate in the NCAA Division III and the Southern Athletic Association.

Men's sports include baseball, basketball, cheerleading, cross country, football, golf, lacrosse, soccer, tennis, and track and field, and the addition of a 2019–2020 swim team. Women's sports include basketball, cheerleading, cross country, dance team, golf, lacrosse, soccer, softball, tennis, track and field, and volleyball, and the addition of a 2019–2020 swim team.

The Majors had a fierce football and basketball rivalry with Mississippi College in nearby Clinton through the 1950s before the competition was suspended after an infamous student brawl at a basketball game.  Campus legend says the brawl was sparked by the alleged theft of the body of Millsaps founder Major Millsaps by Mississippi College students.  The rivalry was considered by many as the best in Mississippi, featuring a prank by Mississippi College students who painted "TO HELL WITH MILSAPS" (sic) on the Millsaps Observatory.  The football rivalry resumed in 2000 as the "Backyard Brawl", with games at Mississippi Veterans Memorial Stadium.  The rivalry took a one-year hiatus in 2005 but resumed in 2006.

Millsaps was the summer training camp home for the NFL's New Orleans Saints in 2006, 2007, and 2008.

Millsaps was also home to the famous game-ending play in the 2007 Trinity vs. Millsaps football game, in which Trinity University executed 15 laterals on the way to a touchdown, defeating Millsaps by a score of 28–24.  The play later won the Pontiac Game-Changing Performance of the Year award, which had never before been bestowed upon a play outside of the NCAA's Bowl Subdivision.

In 2008, Millsaps quarterback Juan Joseph was awarded the Conerly Trophy, which goes to the best football player in the state of Mississippi.

Greek organizations
The school is home to six different fraternities: Kappa Alpha Order, Sigma Alpha Epsilon, Pi Kappa Alpha, Lambda Chi Alpha, Kappa Sigma, and Alpha Phi Alpha; as well as six sororities: Delta Delta Delta, Kappa Delta, Phi Mu, Chi Omega, Alpha Kappa Alpha, and Zeta Phi Beta.

Notable faculty and alumni
 Bidwell Adam (Class of 1913), Democratic politician; Lieutenant Governor of Mississippi from 1928 to 1932, lawyer in Gulfport
 Rodney J. Bartlett, quantum chemist and Guggenheim Fellowship winner
 Michael Beck, actor
 Jim C. Barnett, physician and surgeon from Brookhaven; member of the Mississippi House of Representatives from 1992 to 2008.
 Gary Burghoff, actor who played Radar O'Reilly on the TV series M*A*S*H
 Johnny Carson, longtime host of The Tonight Show, V12 Alumnus
 Turner Cassity, poet
 Roy Clyde Clark, Bishop of the United Methodist Church
 Lisa D'Amour, Obie Award winning playwright
 David Herbert Donald, historian
 Nancy Plummer Faxon, organist and composer
 Ellen Gilchrist, author
 James E. Graves Jr., judge, Supreme Court of Mississippi
 Winifred Green, American activist from Mississippi during the civil rights movement
 Scott Tracy Griffin, author
Ben M. Hall, author, historian
 William Hester (1933), president of the United States Tennis Association from 1977 to 1978.
 Alan Hunter, MTV VJ
 James Kimbrell, poet and Guggenheim Fellowship winner
 Clay Foster Lee Jr., Bishop of the United Methodist Church
 Ray Marshall, Secretary of Labor during the Carter administration
 Robert S. McElvaine history professor, author, and political commentator
 Greg Miller, poet
 Lewis Nordan, author
 Kiese Laymon, writer and professor
 Christopher Lee Nutter, author
 Claude Passeau, All-Star pitcher in Major League Baseball during the 1930s and 1940s
 Rubel Phillips, Republican gubernatorial nominee in 1963 and 1967
 Paul Ramsey, ethicist
 Tate Reeves, Governor of Mississippi 
Chelsea Rick, Miss Mississippi 2013
 Robert C. Robbins, 22nd and current President of The University of Arizona and former CEO of the Texas Medical Center
 Stokes Robertson Jr., Justice of the Supreme Court of Mississippi from 1966 to 1982
 Vic Roby, former NBC staff announcer
Myron S. McNeil, Mississippi state legislator
 Kevin Sessums, journalist and author
 Donald Triplett, first person to be diagnosed with autism
 Eudora Welty, author
 Cassandra Wilson, jazz vocalist and musician
 General Louis H. Wilson Jr., Medal of Honor recipient and 26th Commandant of the Marine Corps (1975—1979)
 Robert William Lowry (pastor) LGBTQIA+ activist and religious leader

See also

References

External links

Millsaps Athletics website

 
Buildings and structures in Jackson, Mississippi
Education in Hinds County, Mississippi
Education in Jackson, Mississippi
Educational institutions established in 1890
1890 establishments in Mississippi
Universities and colleges accredited by the Southern Association of Colleges and Schools
Liberal arts colleges in Mississippi
Universities and colleges in the Jackson metropolitan area, Mississippi
Private universities and colleges in Mississippi